Pericyma vinsonii is a moth of the  family Erebidae. It is found in Mauritius, La Réunion and Madagascar.

It has a wingspan of approx. 34 mm for the males and 41 mm for the females.  Their larvae are commonly found on Delonix regia, a Fabaceae but most probably they are polyphage, as the adults can also be found up to altitudes of 1000m were this plant isn't found.

References

Ophiusina
Moths described in 1862
Moths of Madagascar
Moths of Mauritius
Moths of Réunion